WWE action figures are poseable action figures based on wrestlers and personalities of WWE. They are currently manufactured by Mattel and have formerly been manufactured by Jakks and Hasbro.

LJN
With the rise in popularity that the wrestling industry experienced during the 1980s, Titan Sports (the parent company of the WWF) contracted LJN to produce the first wrestling action figures in 1984. The figures stood at 8" tall. In 1989 LJN closed its toy division, and the WWF contract was awarded to Hasbro.

Hasbro
Hasbro began producing the company's action figures in 1990. The toys were manufactured from plastic and although not fully articulated, had various spring-loaded action features such as punches and clotheslines, although they were not unique to each figure.

Jakks Pacific
Production of WWF/E toys by the Jakks Pacific corporation began in 1996, and ended in December 2009. Jakks started with the "Superstars" line with mostly popular WWE personnel at that time.

Mattel
Mattel took over production of WWE action figures. The new line-up was introduced on January 1, 2010 on wwe.com. The line included the "Basic" line, similar to the Jakks Pacific "Ruthless Aggression" line.

See also
Wrestling Superstars
WWF Hasbro action figures
WWE Legends action figures (Mattel)

References

External links
WWE Figures - Mattel

WWE
Action figures